Iona College is a state-integrated girls' school in the Hawke's Bay area of New Zealand's North Island. Founded in 1914 by the Presbyterian Church, it was intended to provide boarding facilities for girls from rural communities. Today, the college has a capped roll of 250 New Zealand and international students – 150 boarders and 100-day girls. Iona is consistently ranked amongst the top schools in New Zealand for academic results.

A large performing arts centre and information centre started being built in March 2013 and were finished halfway through 2014. During the 100 years celebration that took place in March 2014 tours were conducted of the partially finished buildings.

History

Iona College is the oldest Presbyterian School in New Zealand. It was established as a girls' boarding school built on land donated by Hugh Campbell.

The Prime Minister, the Right Honourable W F Massey, opened Iona College on 14 February 1914.

Iona opened with a roll of 48 pupils who were accommodated in buildings that were habitable but unfinished.

Iona's buildings were severely affected by the 1931 Hawke's Bay earthquake and the College had to be closed for a year while refinancing and rebuilding took place. The opening roll in 1932 was 27 boarders and nine-day pupils.

The school chapel is named after Saint Martin.

Iona was a private school until December 1998, when it integrated into the state education system.

Shannon Warren (formerly of Seymour College, Adelaide) replaced Pauline Duthie as Principal in July 2014.

Notable alumni
Sandra Edge (born 1962), Silver Fern
Victoria Kelly, musician

References

Educational institutions established in 1914
Schools in Hastings, New Zealand
Boarding schools in New Zealand
Girls' schools in New Zealand
Presbyterian schools in New Zealand
Secondary schools in the Hawke's Bay Region
1914 establishments in New Zealand
Alliance of Girls' Schools Australasia